James Oswald Dykes (14 August 1835, Port Glasgow - 1 January 1912, Edinburgh) was a Scottish Presbyterian clergyman and educator.

Biography
James Oswald Dykes studied at Dumfries Academy and at the universities of Edinburgh, Heidelberg, and Erlangen. He was ordained to the Presbyterian ministry in 1859.  From 1861 to 1864 he served with Robert Smith Candlish of Free St. George's Church, Edinburgh.

Dykes visited the Australian colony of Victoria, where he influenced John Knox Church of Melbourne to join the Presbyterian Church of Victoria in 1867.

In 1869 Dykes was appointed minister of the Regent Square Presbyterian Church, London. Dykes was appointed principal and Barbour Professor of Divinity of the Theological College of the Presbyterian Church of England, now Westminster College, Cambridge, from 1888 to 1907.  Cambridge University awarded him an honorary MA in 1900. In June 1901, he received an honorary doctorate of divinity from the University of Glasgow.

He died on the 1st January, 1912 and is buried on the eastern side of Highgate Cemetery.

Works
His publications include:  
 From Jerusalem to Antioch (1875)
 The Law of the Ten Words (1884)
 The Gospel according to St. Paul (1888)
 Plain Words on Great Themes (1892)
 The Christian Minister and his Duties (1908)
 The Divine Worker in Creation and Providence (1909)

References

External links
Portrait of Reverend James Oswald Dykes, ca. 1865

Scottish Calvinist and Reformed theologians
1835 births
1912 deaths
Burials at Highgate Cemetery
People from Port Glasgow
Alumni of the University of Edinburgh
19th-century Ministers of the Free Church of Scotland